Worland Municipal Airport  is in Washakie County, Wyoming, three miles south of Worland, which owns it. It was built in 1953. It has no scheduled airline service; Great Lakes Airlines pulled out on September 30, 2016.

Federal Aviation Administration records say the airport had 2,996 passenger boardings (enplanements) in calendar year 2008, 2,650 in 2009 and 2,737 in 2010. The National Plan of Integrated Airport Systems for 2011–2015 categorized it as a non-primary commercial service airport (between 2,500 and 10,000 enplanements per year).

Facilities
The airport covers 690 acres (279 ha) at an elevation of 4,252 feet (1,296 m). It has three runways: 16/34 is 7,001 by 100 feet (2,134 x 30 m) asphalt, 10/28 is 2,501 by 60 feet (762 x 18 m) turf and 4/22 is 2,241 by 60 feet (683 x 18 m) turf.

In the 12 months ending May 31, 2018, the airport had 3,325 aircraft operations, average 9 per day: 70% general aviation and 30% air taxi. 16 aircraft were then based at the airport: 38% single-engine, 13% jet, and 50% helicopter.

References

Other sources 

 Essential Air Service documents (Docket OST-1997-2981) from the U.S. Department of Transportation:
 Order 2000-5-14 (May 11, 2000): tentatively reselecting Great Lakes Aviation to provide essential air service at Laramie, Rock Springs and Worland, Wyoming, for the two years from May 1, 2000 – April 30, 2002, at an annual subsidy of $297,633, for Laramie, $465,023, for Rock Springs, and $353,345 for Worland.
 Order 2002-7-20 (July 11, 2002): extends the interim subsidy rates of Great Lakes Aviation, Ltd. at each of the communities listed (Page, AZ; Alamosa, CO; Pueblo, CO; Ironwood, MI/Ashland, WI; McCook, NE; Laramie, WY; Rock Springs, WY; Worland, WY; Moab, UT; Vernal, UT).
 Order 2004-7-16 (July 20, 2004): selects Great Lakes Aviation, Ltd., to provide essential air service with 19-passenger B1900D aircraft at Laramie, Riverton, Rock Springs, and Worland, Wyoming, for two years for annual subsidy rates of $397,400, $394,046, $390,488, and $797,844, respectively.
 Order 2006-9-9 (September 11, 2006): re-selecting Great Lakes Aviation, Ltd., operating as both a United Airlines and Frontier code-share partner, to provide subsidized essential air service (EAS) at Laramie and Worland, Wyoming, at an annual subsidy rate of $487,516 for Laramie and $972,757 for Worland, for the two years of October 1, 2006, through September 30, 2008.
 Order 2008-7-3 (July 1, 2008): re-selecting Great Lakes Aviation, Ltd., operating as both a United Airlines and Frontier Airlines code-share partner, to provide subsidized essential air service (EAS) at Laramie and Worland, Wyoming, at an annual subsidy rate of $1,215,603 for Laramie and $1,735,814 for Worland, for the two years of October 1, 2008, through September 30, 2010.
 Order 2010-8-10 (August 18, 2010): selecting Great Lakes Aviation, Ltd., operating as both a United Airlines and Frontier Airlines code share partner, to provide essential air service (EAS) at Laramie and Worland, for a combined annual subsidy of $2,951,908, for the two years from October 1, 2010, to September 30, 2012.

External links 
 Worland Municipal Airport at City of Worland website
 Aerial image as of July 1994 from USGS The National Map
 
 

 Airports in Wyoming
 Former Essential Air Service airports
 Buildings and structures in Washakie County, Wyoming
 Transportation in Washakie County, Wyoming
 Worland, Wyoming